Malsawmzuala (born 12 September 1997) is an Indian professional footballer who plays as a midfielder for Mohammedan in the I-League.

Career

Bengaluru FC
Malsawmzuala made his debut for Bengaluru FC on 9 January 2015 against Salgaocar. On 10 April 2016, Malsawmzuala scored screamer against East Bengal F.C. in a crucial game in I-League.

Delhi Dynamos (loan)
On 2 September 2016, ISL club Delhi Dynamos secure the signing of Malsawmzuala on loan from Bengaluru FC. On 18 November 2016, Sawmtea scored his first ISL goal against FC Pune City in debut match for Delhi Dynamos. Sawmtea is youngest goal scorer in history of Indian Super League.

ATK
In July 2018, Sawmtea signed with Kolkata based club ATK for 2 years.

Jamshedpur FC(loan)
On 30 November 2018, Jamshedpur FC signed Malsawmzuala on loan for remaining of the season from ATK.

International career
Malsawmzuala has made debut for India U19 in Frenz International U19 Cup which was held in Malaysia. On 4 January 2015, he made his debut for India U19 against Estudiantes coming-on as 64th-minute substitute for Robinson Singh at the UiTM Stadium.

Career statistics

References

External links
 

1997 births
Living people
Indian footballers
Chanmari FC players
Bengaluru FC players
Odisha FC players
I-League players
Indian Super League players
India youth international footballers
People from Aizawl
Footballers from Mizoram
Association football midfielders